Claudius Claudianus, known in English as Claudian (c. 370 – c. 404 AD), was a Latin poet associated with the court of the Roman emperor Honorius at Mediolanum (Milan), and particularly with the general Stilicho. His work, written almost entirely in hexameters or elegiac couplets, falls into three main categories: poems for Honorius, poems for Stilicho, and mythological epic.

Life
Claudian was born in Alexandria. He arrived in Rome in 394 and made his mark as a court poet with a eulogy of his two young patrons, Probinus and Olybrius, consuls of 395. He wrote a number of panegyrics on the consulship of his patrons, praise poems for the deeds of Stilicho, and invectives directed at Stilicho's rivals in the Eastern court of Arcadius.

Little is known about his personal life, but it seems he was a convinced pagan: Augustine refers to him as the 'adversary of the name of Christ' (Civitas Dei, V, 26), and Paul Orosius describes him as an 'obstinate pagan' (paganus pervicacissimus) in his Adversus paganos historiarum libri septem (VII, 55).

He was well rewarded for his political engagement. In fact, he was granted the rank of vir illustris. The Roman Senate honored him with a statue in the Roman Forum in 400. Stilicho's wife, Serena, secured a rich wife for him.

Since none of Claudian's poems record the achievements of Stilicho after 404, scholars assume Claudian died in that year. His works don't give an account of the sack of Rome, while the writings of Olympiodorus of Thebes has been edited and made known only in few fragments, which begin from the death of Stilicho.

As poet
Although a native speaker of Greek, Claudian is one of the best Latin poetry stylists of late antiquity. He is not usually ranked among the top tier of Latin poets, but his writing is elegant, he tells a story well, and his polemical passages occasionally attain an unmatchable level of entertaining vitriol. The literature of his time is generally characterized by a quality modern critics find specious, of which Claudian's work is not free, and some find him cold and unfeeling.

Claudian's poetry is a valuable historical source, though distorted by the conventions of panegyric. The historical or political poems connected with Stilicho have a manuscript tradition separate from the rest of his work, an indication that they were likely published as an independent collection, perhaps by Stilicho himself after Claudian's death.

His most important non-political work is an unfinished epic, De raptu Proserpinae ("The Abduction of Proserpina"). The three extant books are believed to have been written in 395 and 397. In the 20th and early 21st centuries, Claudian has not been among the most popular Latin poets of antiquity, but the epic De raptu influenced painting and poetry for centuries.

Works

Panegyricus dictus Probino et Olybrio consulibus
De raptu Proserpinae (unfinished epic, 3 books completed)
In Rufinum ("Against Rufinus")
De Bello Gildonico ("On the Gildonic revolt")
In Eutropium ("Against Eutropius")
Fescennina / Epithalamium de Nuptiis Honorii Augusti
Panegyricus de Tertio Consulatu Honorii Augusti
Panegyricus de Quarto Consulatu Honorii Augusti 
Panegyricus de Consulatu Flavii Manlii Theodori 
De Consulatu Stilichonis
Panegyricus de Sexto Consulatu Honorii Augusti
De Bello Gothico ("On the Gothic War" of 402–403)
Gigantomachy
Epigrams
Lesser poems:  Phoenix, Epithalamium Palladio et Celerinae; de Magnete; de Crystallo cui aqua inerat

Editions and translations
 Hall, J.B.. Claudian, De raptu Proserpinae (Cambridge University Press, 1969).
Dewar, Michael, editor and translator. Claudian Panegyricus de Sexto Consulatu Honorii Augusti (Oxford Clarendon Press, 1996).
 Slavitt, David R., translator. Broken Columns: Two Roman Epic Fragments: The Achilleid of Publius Papinius Statius and The Rape of Proserpine of Claudius Claudianus, with an Afterword by David Konstan (Philadelphia: University of Pennsylvania Press, 1997).
Gruzelier, Claire, editor (translation, introduction, commentary). Claudian, De raptu Proserpinae (Oxford Clarendon Press, 1997). 
 Baier, Thomas and Anne Friedrich, Claudianus. Der Raub der Proserpina, edition, translation and commentary (Darmstadt: WBG (Wissenschaftliche Buchgesellschaft), 2009), Edition Antike.
 English verse translations of Claudian online: 
 A. Hawkin's translation (rhymed couplet) via Google Books.
 J. Strutt's translation (blank verse) via Internet Archive.
The rape of Proserpine: with other poems, from Claudian (1814). Translated into English verse, with a prefatory discourse, and occasional notes.  By Jacob George Strutt.
The rape of Proserpine:  a poem in three books (1854). Translated by Henry Edward John Howard (1795–1868).
The rape of Proserpine (1714). With the story of Sextus and Erichtho, from the Pharsalia of Lucan. Translated by Jabez Hughes (c. 1685 – 1731).

See also
Allegory in the Middle Ages
Classical Latin
Late Latin
Latin poetry

References

Further reading
 Barnes, Michael H. 2005. "Claudian." In A Companion to Ancient Epic. Edited by John Miles Foley, 539–549. Oxford: Blackwell.
 Cameron, A. 1970. Claudian. Poetry and Propaganda at the Court of Honorius. Oxford: Oxford University Press.
 Cameron, A. 2015. Wandering Poets and Other Essays on Late Greek Literature and Philosophy. New York: Oxford Univ. Press.
 Christiansen, P. G. 1997. "Claudian: A Greek or a Latin?" Scholia 6:79–95.
 Ehlers, Widu-Wolfgang, editor. 2004. Aetas Claudianea. Eine Tagung an der Freien Universität Berlin vom 28. bis 30. Juni 2002 München/Leipzig: K.G. Saur.
Fletcher, David T. “Whatever Happened to Claudius Claudianus? A Pedagogical Proposition.” The Classical Journal, vol. 104, no. 3, 2009, pp. 259–273.
 Gruzelier, C. E. “Temporal and Timeless in Claudian's 'De Raptu Proserpinae'.” Greece & Rome, vol. 35, no. 1, 1988, pp. 56–72.
Guipponi-Gineste, Marie-France. 2010. Claudien: poète du monde à la cour d'Occident. Collections de l'Université de Strasbourg. Études d'archéologie et d'histoire ancienne. Paris: De Boccard.
 Long, J. 1996. "Juvenal Renewed in Claudian's "In Eutropium"." International Journal of the Classical Tradition 2.3: 321-335. 
Luck, Georg. 1979. "Disiecta Membra: On the Arrangement of Claudian’s Carmina Minora." Illinois Classical Studies 4: 200–213.
 Martiz, J.A. 2000. "The Classical Image of Africa: The Evidence from Claudian." Acta Classica 43: 81–99.
 Miller, P.A. 2004. Subjecting Verses: Latin Love Elegy and the Emergence of the Real.  Princeton: Princeton University Press.
 Mulligan, B. 2007. "The Poet from Egypt? Reconsidering Claudian's Eastern Origin." Philologus 151.2: 285–310.
</ref>
 Parkes, Ruth. 2015. "Love or War? Erotic and Martial Poetics in Claudian's De Raptu Proserpinae." The Classical Journal 110.4: 471–492.
 Ratti, S. 2008. "Une lecture religieuse des invectives de Claudien est-elle possible?" AnTard 16: 177–86.
Roberts, Michael. “Rome Personified, Rome Epitomized: Representations of Rome in the Poetry of the Early Fifth Century.” The American Journal of Philology, vol. 122, no. 4, 2001, pp. 533–565. 
 Wasdin, Katherine. 2014. "Honorius Triumphant: Poetry and Politics in Claudian's Wedding Poems." Classical Philology 109.1: 48–65.
 Ware, Catherine. 2012. Claudian and the Roman Epic Tradition. Cambridge, UK: Cambridge Univ. Press.
 Wheeler, Stephen M. 1995. "The Underworld Opening of Claudian’s De Raptu Proserpinae." Transactions of the American Philological Association 125:113–134.

External links

 
 Full Latin text on Divus Angelus  
Complete Latin text and English translation (Platnauer, 1922), at LacusCurtius, Bill Thayer's edition
Michael Hendry, critical edition (Latin)

400s deaths
4th-century Latin writers
4th-century Roman poets
4th-century Romans
5th-century Latin writers
5th-century Roman poets
5th-century Romans
Late-Roman-era pagans
Claudii
Roman-era Alexandrians
Year of birth unknown
Year of birth uncertain